The Gold Fire was a wildfire that burned during the 2020 California wildfire season south of Adin along Highway 139 in Lassen County, California in the United States.

Events

Related links 
2020 California wildfires

References

Wildfires in Lassen County, California
2020 California wildfires